Larry Frank Cedar (born March 6, 1955) is an American voice, film and television actor, best known as one of the players of the Children's Television Workshop mathematics show Square One TV on PBS from 1987 to 1994. He played Max, Alex the Butcher's assistant, in a series of commercials for Kroger in 1989. He is also known for playing Leon, the opium-addicted thief and faro dealer, in the internationally acclaimed HBO series Deadwood.

Life and career
Cedar's professional acting career did not begin until shortly after his admission to Hastings Law School when, on an impulse, he decided to audition for, and was accepted into the MFA Theater program at UCLA, from which he graduated in 1978. While there, he won the Hugh O'Brian Acting Competition award for Best Actor, resulting in a one-year artist development contract with Universal Studios. He went on to star in various television films, and numerous episodics and feature films, including a starring role opposite Rebecca De Mornay in the Ivan Reitman-produced Feds, and an appearance as The Creature on the Wing, opposite John Lithgow, in the Steven Spielberg remake, Twilight Zone: The Movie, directed by George Miller. He has also won an L.A. Theater Alliance Ovation Award for Best Featured Actor in a Musical. Other actors in Cedar's family include Jon Cedar and George Cedar.

Cedar spent six seasons in New York starring in the award-winning PBS series Square One TV, and later starred in 40 episodes of the Fox television series A.J.'s Time Travelers. A veteran stage performer, he appeared in the one-man play Billy Bishop Goes to War at the Colony Theatre. He has been nominated for two Los Angeles Theater Alliance Ovation awards for his performances in Anything Goes (as Lord Oakley) opposite Rachel York, and in She Loves Me (as Sipos, for which he won Best Featured Actor in a Musical). His other stage work includes portraying Hoagy Carmichael in Hoagy, Bix, and Wolfgang Beethoven Bunkhaus at L.A.'s Mark Taper Forum; as Vernon opposite Lea Thompson in They're Playing Our Song; and as Secretary Thompson in 1776 opposite Roger Rees.

In August 2008, Cedar appeared in Towelhead, the directorial debut of Alan Ball (creator of Six Feet Under). He co-starred opposite Adrien Brody as the demented Chester Sinclair in the Ben Affleck/Diane Lane noir feature film Hollywoodland, directed by Allen Coulter, and recurred for three seasons as Leon, the opium-addicted card dealer and thief, in the David Milch helmed HBO series Deadwood opposite Powers Boothe and Ian McShane. His independent film work includes the award winning short Tel Aviv, the science fiction thriller Forecast, and the full-length horror film Midnight Son. He has also done voice-over work for hundreds of commercials, cartoon series, and video games.

In 2010, Cedar had a role in The Crazies, playing Principal Ben Sandborn. From 2011-2012 he portrayed Cornelius Hawthorne, father of Chevy Chase's character Pierce Hawthorne, on 2 episodes of Community.

Cedar is active in the Los Angeles theatre community. In 2013 he starred in King Lear with The Porters of Hellsgate. For the 2013 Hollywood Fringe Festival, he developed the script for Orwellian: Rants, Recollections, and Cautionary Tales From The Works of Eric Arthur Blair, which is a one-hour adaptation of three works by George Orwell: Down and Out in Paris and London, Animal Farm, and Nineteen Eighty-Four. The play was produced by The Porters of Hellsgate in conjunction with the Orwell estate.

Filmography

Film roles
 The Babe - Radio announcer 
 Atlas Shrugged: Part III - Dr. Floyd Ferris
 C.H.U.D. II: Bud the C.H.U.D. - Graves
 Constantine - Vermin Man
 Demonic Toys - Peterson
 Dreamscape - Snakeman
 Fear and Loathing in Las Vegas - Car Rental Agent
 Hollywoodland - Chester Sinclair
 Justice League: Gods and Monsters - Pete Ross
 Justice League: Throne of Atlantis - Thomas Curry
 National Treasure: Book of Secrets - Control Room Guard
 Paparazzi - Charlie
 Pinocchio's Revenge - District Attorney
 The Crazies - Principal Ben Sandborn
 The Gingerdead Man - Jimmy Dean
 The Hidden - Brem
 The London Connection - Roger Pike
 The Master of Disguise - Businessman
 Towelhead - Photographer
 Twilight Zone: The Movie - Creature on the Wing (Episode #4)
The Snow Queen 2 - Eric

Television roles 
 Battlestar Galactica - Cadet Shields
 Ben 10 - Howell Wainwright (voice)
 Boston Legal - Robert Hooper
 Charmed - Demon Xar
 Community - Cornelius Hawthorne
 Deadwood - Leon (3 seasons)
 Freakazoid! - Anton Mohans, Bernt, Chip Clavicle, Hans, Oblongata (voice)
 Get a Life - Ted (2 episodes)
 Saved by the Bell - Mystery Weekend actor
 Square One Television - Series Regular
 Stargate SG-1 - Ori Prior #2 (Episode: "Origin")
 Star Trek: Deep Space Nine - Nydrom (Episode: "Armageddon Game")
 Star Trek: Voyager - Tersa
 Star Trek: Enterprise - Tessic
 State of Mind - Larry Carson
 The Riches - Karl
 Two and a Half Men - Policeman/Announcer (2 episodes)
 W*A*L*T*E*R (unsold M*A*S*H spinoff) - Zipkin
 Without a Trace - Ray Pallidies
 The Last Tycoon - Dr. Harold Grife (episode "More Stars Than There Are in Heaven")
Young Sheldon - Lawrence, as train museum keeper

Video game roles
 EverQuest II - Rune Shimmerstar, Tristan Gallaway, Eorandalanu Otuden, Alchemist Alus Crispian, Dyric Pyre, Waylon March, The Glademaster, Generic Male Dark Elf Merchant, Generic Male Erudite Merchant, Generic Male Gnome Merchant, Generic Male Halfling Merchant, Generic Male Human Merchant, Generic Male Ratonga Merchant, Generic Dark Elf Guard, Various Character Languages
 Hitman: Absolution - Edward Wade
 Marvel: Ultimate Alliance - Loki
 Shadow of Rome - Maecanas, Additional Voices
 SOCOM II U.S. Navy SEALs - Vandal
 Star Wars: The Old Republic - Additional Voices
 Tony Hawk's Pro Skater 4 - San Francisco Bike Messenger
 Tony Hawk's Underground - Slave Driver, Second Tampa Cop, Team Filmer
 Tony Hawk's Underground 2 - Additional Voices
 Ultimate Spider-Man - Additional Voices

References

External links
 
 Larry Cedar's website

Date of birth missing (living people)
Living people
American male film actors
American male television actors
American male voice actors
Male actors from California
Place of birth missing (living people)
UCLA Film School alumni
20th-century American male actors
21st-century American male actors
1955 births